Bat-Ochiryn Bolortuyaa (born 15 May 1997) is a Mongolian freestyle wrestler. She won one of the bronze medals in the women's 53 kg event at the 2020 Summer Olympics held in Tokyo, Japan. She is a bronze medalist at the World Wrestling Championships. She is also a gold and two-time bronze medalist at the Golden Grand Prix Ivan Yarygin held in Krasnoyarsk, Russia.

Career 

She won the bronze medal in the 55kg event at the 2019 Asian U23 Wrestling Championship held in Ulaanbaatar, Mongolia. At the 2019 World Wrestling Championships held in Nur-Sultan, Kazakhstan, she won one of the bronze medals in the women's 55 kg event.

She represented Mongolia at the 2020 Summer Olympics in Tokyo, Japan. In October 2021, she was eliminated in her first match in the women's 53 kg event at the World Wrestling Championships held in Oslo, Norway.

In 2022, she won the gold medal in the women's 53 kg event at the Golden Grand Prix Ivan Yarygin held in Krasnoyarsk, Russia. She also won the gold medal in the women's 53 kg event at the Yasar Dogu Tournament held in Istanbul, Turkey.

Achievements

References

External links 
 
 
 

1997 births
Living people
Mongolian female sport wrestlers
World Wrestling Championships medalists
People from Khovd Province
Wrestlers at the 2020 Summer Olympics
Medalists at the 2020 Summer Olympics
Olympic bronze medalists for Mongolia
Olympic medalists in wrestling
Olympic wrestlers of Mongolia
21st-century Mongolian women